Butana Moses Komphela (died 24 January 2022) was a South African politician who represented the African National Congress (ANC) in the National Assembly and Free State Provincial Legislature until 2019. He served as the Chairperson of the Portfolio Committee on Sports, Arts and Culture and after that he held several positions in the Free State Executive Council from 2011 to 2019. He died of COVID-19-related illness in 2022.

National legislature 
After the end of apartheid in 1994, Komphela represented the ANC in the Free State Provincial Legislature before gaining election to a seat in the National Assembly, the lower house of the South African Parliament. He rose to public prominence as the Chairperson of the Portfolio Committee on Sports, Arts and Culture, a position to which he was elected in 2000. According to journalist Stephen Grootes, Komphela was viewed as a firm supporter of former President Thabo Mbeki, although he was suspected of changing his allegiance after Mbeki's rival, Jacob Zuma, won election as ANC President in 2007. Komphela was re-elected to his seat in the National Assembly in the 2009 general election, but he left Parliament in June 2011 when he was appointed to the Free State Executive Council in a reshuffle by Premier Ace Magashule.

Provincial legislature 
Komphela joined Magashule's provincial government as the Free State's Member of the Executive Council (MEC) for Police, Roads and Transport; he filled a vacancy that had arisen from Thabo Manyoni's resignation. He served in that position for over five years and, in the middle of that period, he secured re-election to the Free State Provincial Legislature in the 2014 general election; he was ranked fifth on the ANC's provincial party list. 

In October 2016, Magashule announced a reshuffle that saw Komphela replace Benny Malakoane as MEC for Health. He retained that portfolio for the rest of Magashule's premiership and into the term of Magashule's successor, Premier Sisi Ntombela. In her first reshuffle in May 2018, Ntombela moved Komphela to a new position as MEC for Social Development. 

He did not seek re-election to the Free State Provincial Legislature in the 2019 general election and he therefore dropped out of the Executive Council after the election.

Culpable homicide charge 
On 6 January 2019, Komphela was involved in a traffic accident on the road from Theunissen to Bloemfontein. His BMW reportedly veered to the right and crossed barrier lines to collide with a car that was driving in the opposite direction. One of the passengers in the other car died at the scene and Komphela was charged with culpable homicide. He was found guilty on 22 November 2021 and the Brandfort Magistrate's Court sentenced him to three years' imprisonment; the sentence was suspended for five years on the condition that Komphela did not commit a similar offence during the period of suspension.

Personal life and death 
In December 2021, Komphela was admitted to hospital in Bloemfontein, where he received treatment for COVID-19-related illness, complicated by a pre-existing lung condition. He died in hospital on 24 January 2022, aged 65. He was the elder brother of Steve Komphela, the coach of the Mamelodi Sundowns.

References

External links 

 

Living people
Date of birth missing (living people)
Members of the Free State Provincial Legislature
African National Congress politicians
21st-century South African politicians
University of the Free State alumni